Wasala Mudiyanselage Pasan Nirmitha Wanasinghe (born September 30, 1970 Colombo, Sri Lanka) is a Sri Lankan first class cricketer. An all-rounder, he is a right arm fast-medium bowler and is right-handed top order batsman, usually coming in at 3. Wanasinghe has previously represented Sri Lanka A.

External links
 

1970 births
Living people
Sri Lankan cricketers
Antonians Sports Club cricketers
Galle Cricket Club cricketers